SG Sonnenhof Großaspach, commonly known as Sonnenhof Großaspach, is a German professional football club based in Aspach, Baden-Württemberg. The club is currently playing in the Oberliga Baden-Württemberg, which is the fifth tier of football in the country.

History

The club was formed in 1994 through the union of Spvgg Großaspach and FC Sonnenhof Kleinaspach. The sports club has 1,300 members and, in addition to its football side, has departments for bowling, gymnastics, and table tennis. The term Sonnenhof in the club name comes from the local hotel Sonnenhof in which the meeting was held that resulted in the FC Sonnenhof Kleinaspach was formed.

The footballers have been twice promoted in recent years and reached the Oberliga Baden-Württemberg (IV) in 2005, playing there as a lower table side. In 2008–09, the club achieved its greatest success yet, winning the league and earning the right for promotion to the Regionalliga Süd, where they played until 2012, when the club entered the new Regionalliga Südwest. In 2009, the club qualified for the first time for the first round of the German Cup but was knocked out by VfB Stuttgart after a 1–4 loss, leading 1–0 until the 55th minute.

In 2012–13, the club qualified again for the first round of the German Cup but was knocked out by FSV Frankfurt after a 1–2 loss. The club celebrated its greatest success in 2014 when it won the Regionalliga Südwest and qualified for the promotion round to the 3. Liga, where it overcame VfL Wolfsburg II and earned promotion to the league.

Honours

Players

Current squad

Personnel

Current technical staff

List of managers
This is the list of coaches of SG Sonnenhof Großaspach since 2006:

Statistics

Recent seasons
This is the list of recent season-by-season performance of the club since 2001–02 season:

With the introduction of the Regionalligas in 1994 and the 3. Liga in 2008 as the new third tier, below the 2. Bundesliga, all leagues below dropped one tier.  In 2012, the number of Regionalligas was increased from three to five with all Regionalliga Süd clubs except the Bavarian ones entering the new Regionalliga Südwest.

References

External links
 
SG Sonnenhof Großaspach at Weltfussball.de

 
Association football clubs established in 1994
1994 establishments in Germany
Football clubs in Germany
Football clubs in Baden-Württemberg
Rems-Murr-Kreis
3. Liga clubs